Bob Turner (born 21 June 1936) is a former Australian rules footballer who played with Melbourne in the Victorian Football League (VFL).

Notes

External links 

1936 births
Australian rules footballers from Victoria (Australia)
Melbourne Football Club players
Traralgon Football Club players
Living people